Jalaluddin Ahmed (1890 – 1958) was a Bengali lawyer, jurist and a politician from the Chittagong District.

Early life and career

Ahmed was born in Chakaria of Chittagong to a prominent Muslim land owning family. His family originated from the Harbang area of Cox's Bazar. He was a prominent lawyer in Chittagong and was known for his guiding principles and honesty. He could speak several languages proficiently including Urdu, Persian Bengali and Arabic. He became active in politics in the mid-1930s and was invited to join the cabinet of Huseyn Shaheed Suhrwardy. He was the Health Minister of Bengal under the Huseyn Shaheed Suhrawardy cabinet. He was married to Nafisa Khatun and with her had two daughters, Husna Ara Khan and Basma Ara Ahmed. Ahmed's grandson Abdul Muqtadar Khan (Babu)  was the chairman of GEC (General Electric Company) Bangladesh and a Chartered accountant from England and Wales.  One of his other grandsons, A.M. Khan (Rokon) was a pharmacist, business man  and social personality. He died in 1958 in Dhaka and is interred at Azimpur Graveyard.  He was awarded the title of Khan Bahadur by the British administration for his years of service to the community and for being a prominent landlord.

References

20th-century Bangladeshi lawyers
People from Chittagong District
1890 births
1958 deaths
People from Harbang